François Herbert Endene Elokan (born 20 October 1978) is a Cameroonian retired footballer who played as a forward.

Club career
He previously played for Raja Casablanca, Chengdu, Podbeskidzie Bielsko-Biała, Pogoń Szczecin, ŁKS Łódź, Besa Kavajë and Thể Công FC. He joined T&T Hà Nội, Vietnam in 2009.

Private life
He also holds a Mexican passport.

Honours
Raja Casablanca
 CAF Cup: 2003
Besa Kavajë
 Albanian Cup: 2006-07
Navibank Saigon
 Vietnamese Cup: 2011

References

External links
 
 

1978 births
Living people
Footballers from Yaoundé
Association football forwards
Cameroonian emigrants to Mexico
Naturalized citizens of Mexico
Cameroonian footballers
Mexican footballers
La Piedad footballers
Raja CA players
Chengdu Tiancheng F.C. players
Podbeskidzie Bielsko-Biała players
Pogoń Szczecin players
ŁKS Łódź players
Besa Kavajë players
Viettel FC players
Hanoi FC players
Hòa Phát Hà Nội FC players
Navibank Sài Gòn FC players
Can Tho FC players
Ascenso MX players
Botola players
China League One players
Ekstraklasa players
I liga players
Kategoria Superiore players
V.League 1 players
V.League 2 players
Expatriate footballers in Mexico
Expatriate footballers in Morocco
Expatriate footballers in China
Expatriate footballers in Poland
Expatriate footballers in Albania
Expatriate footballers in Vietnam
Cameroonian expatriate sportspeople in Mexico
Cameroonian expatriate sportspeople in Morocco
Cameroonian expatriate sportspeople in China
Cameroonian expatriate sportspeople in Poland
Cameroonian expatriate sportspeople in Albania
Cameroonian expatriate sportspeople in Vietnam